The Evans Block, also known as Northwestern National Bank Building, is a historic building located in Sioux City, Iowa, United States.  The city experienced a building boom that began in the late 1880s and continued into the early 1890s.  Fred T. Evans, an entrepreneur who had business interests in Iowa, Nebraska and South Dakota, had this building constructed to house Northwestern National Bank of which he was the president.  The bank occupied the main level and other offices were housed on the upper floors.  Local architect Charles P. Brown designed the four-story Romanesque Revival style building.  The Black Hills sandstone for the public facades was from Evans' quarry.  The Panic of 1893 brought Sioux City's building boom to an end, and the Evans block was sold in January 1895.  Subsequently, the building has housed a hotel, a factory, a saloon, and a variety of stores.  It was individually listed on the National Register of Historic Places in 1985, and as a contributing property in the Fourth Street Historic District in 1995.

References

Commercial buildings completed in 1891
Buildings and structures in Sioux City, Iowa
National Register of Historic Places in Sioux City, Iowa
Commercial buildings on the National Register of Historic Places in Iowa
Richardsonian Romanesque architecture in Iowa
Individually listed contributing properties to historic districts on the National Register in Iowa
1891 establishments in Iowa